Ghatak is an Indian family name and surname found amongst Bengali Hindu Brahmins.
  
Ghataks (literally, one who makes things happen) or matchmakers were middleman who established links between the two parties in a marriage. In the past it was not the custom of Indian society, especially of Bengali society, to allow boys and girls to mix freely. This is why the services of Ghataks were widely used to arrange marriages. Many Ghataks were professionals, and matchmaking was their source of livelihood. When the matchmaking resulted in a wedding,  Ghataks used to be rewarded by both parties.

In the past, educated and respectable people used to take up matchmaking as a profession. They were known as 'Kulacharya' and used to maintain books with detailed histories of families. Some of these books have been used as sources for writing the history of Bengal. Some of the well-known matchmakers were Edu Mishra, Hari Mishra (c 13th century), Dhruvananda Mishra, Debibar Ghatak (15th century) and Nulo Panchanan (18th century). They used to enjoy a great deal of social prestige.

Geographical distribution
As of 2014, 78.2% of all known bearers of the surname Ghatak were residents of India and 19.6% were residents of Bangladesh. In India, the frequency of the surname was higher than national average in the following states and union territories:
 1. West Bengal (1: 7,406)
 2. Tripura (1: 31,647)
 3. Andaman and Nicobar Islands (1: 47,493)
 4. Gujarat (1: 72,229)

Notable people with the surname Ghatak

 Ajoy Ghatak (born 1939), Indian physicist
 Anup Ghatak (1941–2013), Indian cricketer
 Gita Ghatak (1931–2009), Indian actress and singer
 Kaushik Ghatak (born 1971), Indian television and film director
 Maitreesh Ghatak (born 1968), Indian economist and academic
 Manish Ghatak (1902–1979), Bengali poet and novelist
 Moloy Ghatak (born 1956), Indian politician
 Poulomi Ghatak (born 1983), Indian table tennis player
 Raj Ghatak (born 1973), Indian-born English actor 
 Ritwik Ghatak (1925–1976), Bengali filmmaker
 Usha Ranjan Ghatak (1931–2005), Indian chemist

References

Indian surnames
Bengali-language surnames
Hindu surnames
Bengali Hindu surnames